Speaking into the Air: A History of the Idea of Communication, written by American scholar John Durham Peters, is a major work in communication studies and  the author's first book. Peters asserts that communicating like angels is "impossible" but it is not just a tragic fact but also a blessed one. This book talks about the history of communication failure from different aspects like philosophy, politics, media technology and so forth. This book won the National Communication Association Award in 2000.

Themes 
Speaking into the Air: A History of the Idea of Communication studies communication failure. It contains five phrases of history of the idea of Communication, Plato's eros, The Bible's one-way dissemination, religious angel communication in Middle Ages, spiritual communication in modern philosophy, and the communication idea in modern communication theory. It also involves the subject machines, animals and aliens as horizons of incommunicability.

See also 
John Durham Peters

References
John Durham Peters, 1999. Speaking into the Air: A History of the Idea of Communication. Chicago: University of Chicago Press

Communication theory